Lisbunny is a townland of 849 acres in County Londonderry, Northern Ireland, about 3 miles Claudy, near the County Tyrone/Londonderry border. It is situated within Derry and Strabane district as well as the civil parish of Cumber Upper and the historic barony of Tirkeeran.

It is a rural farming area with few amenities, although it does contain a stone quarry.

See also
List of townlands in County Londonderry

References

Townlands of County Londonderry
Civil parish of Cumber Upper
Derry and Strabane district